The Thought of Norea is a Sethian Gnostic text. It is the second tractate in Codex IX of the Nag Hammadi library. The text consists of only 52 lines, making it one of the shortest tractates in the library. The work is untitled; it is called the Thought of Norea because the phrase appears in the final sentence of the text. The original text may have been written in the late second century AD. The version in the codex is a Coptic translation of a Greek original. The text is divided into four parts: an invocation, Norea's cry and deliverance, her activity in the Pleroma, and salvation.

Complete text
Father of All, Ennoia of the Light, dwelling in the heights above the (regions) below, Light dwelling in the heights, Voice of Truth, upright Nous, untouchable Logos, and ineffable Voice, incomprehensible Father!

It is Norea who cries out to them. They heard, (and) they received her into her place forever. They gave it to her in the Father of Nous, Adamas, as well as the voice of the Holy Ones, in order that she might rest in the ineffable Epinoia, in order that [she] might inherit the first mind which [she] had received, and that [she] might rest in the divine Autogenes, and that she (too) might generate herself, just as she also has inherited the living Logos, and that she might be joined to all of the Imperishable Ones, and speak with the mind of the Father.

And she began to speak with the words of Life, and [she] remained in the presence of the Exalted One, possessing that which she had received before the world came into being. She has the great mind of the Invisible One, and she gives glory to [her] Father, and she dwells within those who [...] within the Pleroma, and she beholds the Pleroma.

There will be days when she will behold the Pleroma, and she will not be in deficiency, for she has the four holy helpers who intercede on her behalf with the Father of the All, Adamas. He it is who is within all of the Adams, possessing the thought of Norea, who speaks concerning the two names which create a single name.

Analysis
Norea appears in both the Thought of Norea and Hypostasis of the Archons. In both, Norea is portrayed as a Sophia figure, in need of aid from the Four Luminaries.

The work shares features with other Sethian treatises. Norea demonstrates belief in the heavenly trinity of the Father (Invisible Spirit), Mother (Barbelo), and Son (Autogenes), like Sethian works such as the Apocryphon of John, Trimorphic Protennoia, and Zostrianos. All Sethian works combine Jewish traditions with Platonic doctrines, but some, such as Norea, Three Steles of Seth, and Marsanes, lack clear Christian features. A common thematic element in Sethian works is a descent or ascent component; Norea employs the descent pattern.

References

Sethian texts
Coptic literature
Nag Hammadi library